Maryvonne Blondin (born 20 January 1947) is a member of the Senate of France, representing the Finistère department.  She is a member of the Socialist Party.

Blondin became Deputy mayor of Ergué-Gabéric in 1989. In 2001, she was elected General councillor of Finistère (Brittany) and will become as a consequence one of the vice-presidents of the Counsel General. She was elected Senator on 22 September 2008.

In addition to her work in the Senate, Blondin has been serving as member of the French delegation to the Parliamentary Assembly of the Council of Europe since 2008. In this capacity, she is part of the Socialist Group. She has in the past served as vice-chairwoman of the Committee on Equality and Non-Discrimination and as member of the Committee on the Honouring of Obligations and Commitments by Council of Europe Member States (Monitoring Committee); the Committee on Social Affairs, Health and Sustainable Development; the Sub-Committee on Children; and the Sub-Committee on Gender Equality. In her capacity as member of the Monitoring Committee, she has been the Assembly's rapporteur (alongside Egidijus Vareikis) for Moldova since 2019. She also serves as rapporteur on obstetrical and gynaecological violence.

References

 "Biographies des 65 nouveaux élus au palais du Luxembourg", Le Monde, 23 September 2008.

External links
Page on the Senate website

1947 births
Living people
Socialist Party (France) politicians
French Senators of the Fifth Republic
Women members of the Senate (France)
Senators of Finistère
20th-century French women politicians
21st-century French women politicians
Politicians from Quimper